The 2021 FIBA Intercontinental Cup was the 30th edition of the FIBA Intercontinental Cup. The tournament was played in one game to be held on 6 February 2021. The game was played in Buenos Aires, Argentina. Both teams made their debut in the Intercontinental Cup.

Format
Only two teams joined this year to play a single game.

Teams

Venue

Match details

References

External links
 Official website
 FIBA official website

2021
FIBA
FIBA
FIBA
International basketball competitions hosted by Argentina
FIBA
Sports competitions in Buenos Aires